The men's 400 metres at the 2018 European Athletics Championships took place at the Olympic Stadium on 7, 8, and 10 August.

Records

Schedule

Results

Round 1

First 3 in each heat (Q) and the next fastest 3 (q) advanced to the Semifinals.

Semifinals
First 2 (Q) and next 2 fastest (q) qualify for the final.

*Athletes who received a bye to the semifinals

Final

References

400 M
400 metres at the European Athletics Championships